The 1989–90 Ball State Cardinals men's basketball team represented Ball State University as a member of the Mid-American Conference during the 1989–90 NCAA Division I men's basketball season. After the departure of head coach Rick Majerus, Ball State responded under new coach Dick Hunsaker by having the best season in the school's history. This group of Cardinals became the first team in the Mid-American Conference history to win two consecutive MAC regular season conference championships as well as back-to-back conference tournament titles. The 1990 Ball State basketball team also became the first team in the MAC to reach the Sweet 16 of the NCAA Tournament in its current format. The Cardinals lost in the Sweet 16 to the eventual national champions UNLV Runnin' Rebels, 69–67.

The team was led by many transfer players and two of Coach Hunsaker’s key transfers, starting forwards Paris McCurdy and Curtis Kidd, were high school teammates. They both signed to play their college ball at the University of Arkansas-Little Rock. However, because of disciplinary reasons, the two had to find a new school. Former coach Rick Majerus gave them a second chance, and they came through. The two became the key assets to Ball States Sweet 16 run.

The Cardinals finished the regular season at 24-6 before heading to the NCAA tournament. The Cardinals were a 12 seed and began the tournament at the Huntsman Center in Salt Lake City. They upset the Oregon State Beavers in what was star point guard Gary Payton’s last game in college. They won the game when McCurdy made a three-point play with no time left. Ball State then had to play the Louisville Cardinals next. They ended up defeating Louisville late in the game by a final score of 62–60. Meanwhile, in Muncie, fans stormed the village (the center of Ball State's off campus social scene) after the win. Ball State advanced to face the top-seeded UNLV Runnin' Rebels. Ball State shut down one of the best offenses in college basketball history and had a chance to win it in the final seconds. Down by two, the Cards made a deep pass to tie or take the lead but it was picked off.

Roster

Schedule and results

|-
!colspan=9 style=| Non-conference regular season

|-

|-

|-

|-

|-

|-

|-

|-

|-
!colspan=9 style=| MAC regular season

|-

|-

|-

|-

|-

|-

|-

|-

|-

|-

|-

|-

|-

|-

|-

|-

|-
!colspan=9 style=| MAC tournament

|-

|-

|-
!colspan=9 style=| NCAA tournament
|-

|-

|-

References

1989–90 Mid-American Conference men's basketball season
1989-90
1989 in sports in Indiana
1990 in sports in Indiana
1990 NCAA Division I men's basketball tournament participants